John Biggar may refer to:
 John Biggar (Scottish politician) (1874–1943)
 John Walter Scott Biggar (1843–1897), Ontario political figure
 John Biggar (mountaineer) (born 1964), Scottish mountaineer